Below is a list of notable people born in Kumanovo, North Macedonia or its surroundings:

Sports
 Igor Mihajlovski (1973-), Former basketball player
 Kristijan Manević (1987-), basketball player
 Stefan Kimevski (1990-), handball player
 Nikola Karakolev (1987-), basketball player
 Marko Dujković (1990-), basketball player
 Naser Aliji (1993), football player
 Taulant Seferi (1996-), football player
 Armend Alimi (1987-), football player
 Mensur Kurtisi (1986-), football player
 Saša Ćirić (1968-), former football striker 
 Stole Dimitrievski (1993-), football goalkeeper
 Vlade Lazarevski (1983-), football player
 Nataša Mladenovska (1986-), handball player
 Orhan Mustafi (1990-), football striker
 Boban Nikolovski (1977-), football player
 Redžep Redžepovski (1962-), former boxer
 Ace Rusevski (1956-), former boxer
 Vujadin Stanojković (1962-), football coach

Politics
 Oliver Spasovski (1976-), Minister of Interior of Macedonia (2015 - 2016)
 Dragan Bogdanovski (1929-1998), political, civil rights and anti-communist activist, one of the founders of  VMRO-DPMNE
 Filip Petrovski (1972-), politician, Member of Assembly of Macedonia, civil right activist, Director of the National Archives of Macedonia.
 Jezdimir Bogdanski (1930-2007), President of SR Macedonia (1988-1990)
 Boris Chushkarov (1916-1982), first Director of OZNA for SR Macedonia
 Zoran Damjanovski, (1956-), mayor of Kumanovo (2005 – present)
 Blage Kiprijanovski, (1948-), mayor of Kumanovo (1993–1996)
 Slobodan Kovachevski, mayor of Kumanovo (2000–2005)
 Boris Protikj (1941-2002), mayor of Kumanovo (1996–2000)
 Saltir Putinski, mayor of Kumanovo (1951-1961)
 Teodosiy Dzhartov, mayor
 Mara Naceva, (1920 - 2013),  Macedonian communist, participant in the World War II in Yugoslavia and a national hero
 Maksim Dimitrievski (1975-), politician; Member of Assembly of Macedonia 
 Stanko Mladenovski (1937-), politician; Speakers of the People's Assembly 
 Tode Ilich (1943-2014), mayor of Kumanovo (1984-1986)
 Trajko Loparski mayor of Kumanovo

Arts

 Vladimir Antonov
 Bardhi, rapper, singer
 Bodan Arsovski (1956-),  rock band member
 Ivan Babanovski (1941-), intelligence officer and writer
 Toni Mihajlovski (1967-), actor
 Trajko Prokopiev (1909-1979) writer
 Arif Şentürk (1941-), folk singer and compiler
 Vanja Bulić (1947-), journalist and TV presenter
 Venko Andonovski (1964-), writer
 Jordan Cekov (1921-2019), partisan, journalist, writer
 Danilo Kocevski (1947-), writer
 Slavko Dimevski (1920-1994), writer

Military
 Velika Begovica ( 1876–78), rebel leader
 Hristijan Todorovski Karpoš (1921-1944), communist partisan during the Second World War
 Goran Georgievski (1969-2005),  member of Lions ( 2001-04)
 Toni Mihajlovski (1967-), Lions spokesman ( 2001–04)
 Dejan Denkovski (-2001) member of Reservist
 Ismet Jashari (1967-1998), commander (Kumanova) Kosovo Liberation Army
 Oliver Petrushevski (-2001) member of Lions
 Boban Trajkovski (1973–2001), member of Wolves
 Jovan Dovezenski (8 April 1873 – 2 May 1935), commander (vojvoda)
 Pavle Mladenović - Čiča Pavle (-1905), commander (vojvoda)

Religion

 Timotej of Debar and Kichevo (1951-), current Mitropolitian of Diciose of Debar and Kuchevo ( 1995–present)
 Hilarion of Bregalica (1973-), current Mitropolitian of Diciose of Bregalnica ( 2006–present)
 Hadži-Zaharija (1760 – 1830) Metropolitan of Raška and Prizren ( 1819-30)
 Denko Krstić (1824–1882), influential merchant, born in Mlado Nagoričane
 Dimitrije Mladenović (1794–1890), Orthodox archpriest, born in Proevce ( 1833-90)

Business
 Valentin Ilievski general director of the Messer Group for BiH
 Denko Krstić

Crime
 Romeo Zhivikj - Roki, (1962-2004) Crime Boss ( 1980-2004)
 Bajrush Sejdiu, (1968-) leader of Bajrush gang ( 1990-2008)
 Nezim Allii, leader of Nezim gang ( 2004-2014)

Reference list

Kumanovo